is the most common Japanese surname, often romanized as Sato, Satoh or Satou. Notable people with the surname include:

, Japanese actress and voice actress
, Japanese actress
, Japanese judoka
, Japanese writer
, Japanese diplomat
, Japanese singer
, Japanese voice actress
, Japanese footballer
, Japanese footballer
Akihiro Sato (model), Brazilian model
, Japanese sport shooter
, Japanese politician
, Japanese politician
, Japanese professional wrestler
, Japanese photographer
, Japanese ski jumper
, Japanese shogi player
, Japanese idol, singer, actress and voice actress
, Japanese volleyball player
, Japanese model and weathercaster
Ayano Sato (canoeist) (born 1996), Japanese slalom canoeist
, Japanese idol and singer
, Japanese speed skater
, Japanese ice hockey player
, Japanese actress and musician
, Japanese musician
, Japanese voice actress
, Japanese speed skater
, Japanese singer
, Japanese footballer
, Japanese sculptor
, Japanese screenwriter and musician
, Japanese footballer
, Japanese mathematician
, Japanese footballer
, Japanese footballer
, Japanese board game designer, novelist and manga writer
Daisuke Sato (footballer) (born 1994), Filipino footballer
, Japanese mayor
, Japanese footballer
, Japanese equestrian
, Japanese politician and Prime Minister of Japan
, Japanese politician
, Japanese cross-country skier
Eric Sato (born 1966), American volleyball player
, Japanese actress
, Japanese women's footballer
Eunice Sato (1921–2021), American politician
, Japanese manga artist
Garret T. Sato (1964–2020), American actor
, Japanese voice actor
, Japanese voice actor
G. G. Sato (born 1978), Japanese baseball player
Gordon H. Sato (1927-2017), American cell biologist and environmentalist
, Japanese rower
, Japanese footballer
, Japanese footballer
, Japanese novelist
, Japanese voice actor
, Japanese water polo player
, Japanese luger
, Japanese professional wrestler and mixed martial artist
, Japanese actress and voice actress
, Japanese figure skater
, Japanese footballer
, Japanese poet and translator
, Japanese tennis player
, Japanese basketball player and executive
, Japanese actress, singer and gravure idol
, Japanese javelin thrower
, Japanese singer-songwriter
, Japanese singer-songwriter
, Japanese footballer
, Japanese curler and curling coach
, Japanese basketball player
, Japanese rower
Hisaharu Satoh, Japanese bowls player
, Japanese footballer
, Japanese film director
, Japanese swimmer
, Japanese actress
, Japanese table tennis player
, Japanese cyclist
, Japanese volleyball player
, Japanese actor
, Japanese astronomer
, Japanese Confucianist
, Japanese professional wrestler
, Japanese footballer
, Japanese tennis player
, Japanese actor, screenwriter and film director
Josephine Sato (born 1954), Filipino politician
, Japanese anime director
, Japanese footballer
, Japanese painter
, Japanese film director
Kai Sato (born 1984), American chief operating officer
, Japanese actor
, Japanese karateka
, Japanese cyclist
, Japanese activist, editor and critic
, Japanese biathlete
, Japanese model and television personality
, Japanese footballer
, Japanese speed skater
, Japanese footballer
, Japanese footballer
, Japanese cross-country skier
, Japanese weightlifter
, Japanese shogi player
, Japanese actor
, Japanese mecha and character designer
, Japanese curler
, Japanese baseball player
, Japanese basketball player and coach
, Japanese equestrian
, Japanese journalist
, Japanese footballer
, Japanese composer and conductor
, Japanese footballer
Kimi Sato (born 1949), Japanese composer
, Japanese swimmer
, Japanese racing driver
, Japanese basketball coach
, Japanese footballer
, Japanese professional wrestler
, Japanese actor
, Japanese biathlete
, Japanese footballer
, Japanese philatelist
, Japanese ski jumper
Kōji Satō (photographer) (1911–1955), Japanese photographer
, Japanese politician
, Japanese swimmer
, Japanese general
, Japanese footballer
, Japanese footballer
, Imperial Japanese Navy admiral
, Japanese figure skater and coach
, Japanese Paralympic athlete
Liane Sato (born 1964), American volleyball player
, Japanese sailor
, Japanese actor
, Japanese film director
, Japanese theatre director
Mamoru Sato (born 1937), American modernist sculptor
, Japanese racing driver
, Japanese voice actor and narrator
, Japanese jazz pianist, composer and arranger
, Japanese ice hockey player
, Japanese politician
, Japanese singer and former idol
, Japanese field hockey player
, Japanese ice hockey player
, Japanese footballer
, Japanese film score composer
, Japanese footballer
, Japanese footballer
, Japanese actress and television personality
, Japanese high jumper
, Japanese shamisen player
, Japanese ice hockey player
, Japanese composer, singer and musician
, Japanese voice actor
, Japanese middle-distance runner
, Japanese actress
, Japanese musician
, Japanese television personality, actress and model
, Japanese mathematician
, Japanese archer
, Japanese footballer
, Japanese volleyball player
, Japanese basketball player and women's basketball coach
, Japanese sprinter
, Japanese sport wrestler
, Japanese figure skater
, Japanese volleyball player
, Japanese curler
, Japanese rower
, Japanese composer
, Japanese footballer
, Japanese tennis player
, Japanese diplomat and politician
, Japanese astronomer
, Japanese idol, singer and actress
, Japanese politician
, Japanese scientist
, Japanese golfer
, Japanese basketball coach
, Japanese figure skater and coach
Nobusuke Kishi (1896–1987), born , former Prime Minister of Japan
, Japanese mayor
, Japanese marathon runner
Norie Sato (born 1949), American artist
, Japanese figure skater and coach
, Japanese fencer
, Japanese fencer
O. K. Sato (1871–1921), American vaudeville performer
, Japanese footballer
, Japanese artist, photographer and composer
, Japanese boxer
Pater Sato (1945–1994), Japanese artist
, Japanese badminton player
, Japanese motorcycle racer
, Japanese footballer
Reiko Sato (1931–1981), American dancer and actress
Reinaldo Sato (born 1980), Brazilian baseball player
, Japanese politician
, Japanese racing driver
, Japanese ice hockey player
, Japanese softball player
, Japanese speed skater
, Japanese table tennis player
, Japanese bobsledder
, Japanese voice actress and singer
Risa Sato (born 1994), Filipino-Japanese volleyball player
, Japanese mixed martial artist
Ruth Sato (1904–1992), American dancer, gossip columnist, musician promoter and nightclub manager
, Japanese footballer
, Japanese high jumper
, Japanese football referee
, Japanese actor and entertainer
, Japanese economist
Sabrina Sato (born 1981), Brazilian model
, Japanese sailor
, Japanese actor, film director and screenwriter
, Japanese surgeon
, Japanese poet
, Japanese voice actress and singer
, Japanese footballer
, Japanese cross-country skier
, Japanese badminton player
, Japanese actor and voice actor
, Japanese politician
, better known as Dick Togo, Japanese professional wrestler
, Japanese screenwriter and film director
, Japanese baseball player
, Japanese footballer
, Japanese shogi player
Shinobu Sato (born 1955), Japanese classical guitarist
, Japanese film director, screenwriter and video game designer
, Japanese bobsledder
, Japanese footballer
, Japanese shogi player
, Japanese manga artist
, Japanese model
, Japanese cross-country skier
, Japanese politician
, Japanese footballer
, Japanese writer
, Japanese golfer
, Japanese badminton player
, Japanese manga artist
, Japanese footballer
, Japanese baseball player
, Japanese idol, actor and singer
Shōzō Satō, Japanese playwright and theatre director
, Japanese manga artist
, Japanese shogi player
, Japanese figure skater
, Japanese footballer
, Japanese physician
, Japanese classical violinist and violist
, Japanese composer
, Japanese footballer
, Japanese idol, singer and actress
, Japanese Go player
, Japanese sprint canoeist
, Japanese samurai
, better known as Tadanobu Asano, Japanese actor
, Japanese film critic, theorist and historian
, Imperial Japanese Army officer and politician
Tadashi Sato (1923–2005), American artist
, Japanese footballer
, Japanese dancer and actor
, Japanese politician
, Japanese footballer
, Japanese manga artist
, Japanese water polo player
, Japanese video game character designer, writer and CGI director
, Japanese mixed martial artist
, Japanese actor
Takeshi Sato (born 1981), Japanese professional wrestler
, Japanese graphic designer
, Japanese racing driver
, Japanese basketball player
, Japanese engineer
, Japanese anime screenwriter and director
, Japanese footballer
, Japanese voice actor
, Japanese actress, voice actress, television personality and model
, Japanese sport wrestler
, Japanese politician
, Japanese anime director
, Japanese baseball player
, Japanese video game composer and voice actor
, Japanese rower
, Japanese volleyball player
, Japanese admiral and military theorist
Thomas N. Sato, Japanese educator and biologist
, Japanese photographer
, Japanese cross-country skier
, common-law wife of the Chinese Communist scholar and poet Guo Moruo
, Japanese baseball player
, Japanese baseball player
, Japanese long-distance runner
, Japanese gymnast
, Japanese film director and screenwriter
, Japanese lutenist and composer
, Japanese warrior
, Japanese speed skater
, Japanese light novelist
, Japanese politician
Tsutomu Sato (ophthalmologist) (1902–1960), Japanese ophthalmologist
, Japanese windsurfer
, Japanese footballer
Vicki Sato, American biotechnologist and academic
, Japanese actress and model
, Japanese baseball player
, Japanese shogi player
, Japanese volleyball player
, Japanese footballer
, Japanese footballer
, Japanese handball player
, Japanese footballer
, Japanese kickboxer
, Japanese swimmer
, Japanese baseball player
, Japanese baseball player and coach
, Japanese ski mountaineer
, Japanese boxer
, Japanese baseball player
, Japanese politician
, Japanese footballer
, Japanese film director
, Japanese figure skater
, Japanese javelin thrower
, Japanese triathlete
, Japanese economist and politician
, Japanese long-distance runner
, Japanese footballer
, Japanese softball player
, Japanese voice actor
, Japanese professional wrestler
, Japanese footballer
, Japanese ski jumper
, Japanese racewalker
, Japanese politician
, Japanese voice actress
, Japanese footballer
, Japanese footballer
, Japanese footballer
, Japanese footballer
, Japanese writer
Yukiko Okada (1967–1986), born , Japanese idol singer

Fictional characters
Sato, a character in The Karate Kid Part II
, a character in the manga series High School Girls
Asami Sato, a character in the television series The Legend of Korra
Bruce Sato, from the toy franchise and cartoon M.A.S.K.
, a character in the manga series Castle Town Dandelion
Hiroshi Sato, a character from The Legend of Korra
Hoshi Sato, a character in the television series Star Trek: Enterprise
, protagonist of the light novel Aura: Koga Maryuin's Last War
Inoue Sato, a character in the novel The Lost Symbol
, a character in the manga series Working!!
Jun Sato, a character in the television series Star Wars Rebels
, protagonist of the light novel series KonoSuba
, a character in the light novel series Shakugan no Shana
, a character in the anime series Yu-Gi-Oh! GX
, a character in the visual novel Katawa Shoujo
, a character in the manga series Given
, a character in the manga series Crayon Shin-chan
, a character in the visual novel To Heart
, a character in the manga series Doubt!!
, a character in the manga series Case Closed
Natsumi Sato, a character in the manga series Jiraishin a.k.a. Ice Blade
, a character in the manga series My Hero Academia
, a character in the light novel Aura: Koga Maryuin's Last War
, protagonist of the manga series Kyō no Go no Ni
, a character in the manga series Interviews with Monster Girls
Sebastian Sato, a character in the video game Hitman
, a character in the manga series Maria-sama ga Miteru
, a character in the manga series Whistle!
, a character in the video game series The Idolmaster Cinderella Girls
, a character in the manga series Shokugeki no Soma
, a character in the light novel series Golden Time
, a character in the manga series Welcome to the N.H.K.
Toru Sato (a.k.a. Bull), a character in the video game Need for Speed: Most Wanted
Toshiko Sato, a character in the television series Torchwood and Doctor Who
Toshiya Sato, a character in the manga series Major
, protagonist of the light novel series Ben-To
Sato, a character in the manga series Ajin: Demi-Human
Sato, a character in the film Black Rain
Sato, a character in the anime series Mobile Suit Gundam SEED Destiny

References

Japanese-language surnames